Huh Yoon-jung (30 September 1936 – ? August 2022) was a South Korean footballer who played as a forward.

Playing career 
In 1962, South Korea hosted the World Military Cup final and played against Greek national military team, the winners of the qualifiers. South Korea lost to Greece on aggregate, but Huh received attention by scoring the winning goal in the second leg. After the World Military Cup, Huh was selected for South Korean national team, playing in the 1964 Summer Olympics and the 1964 AFC Asian Cup. He is also the first South Korean footballer to join a foreign football club.

Personal life 
Huh was a relative of Huh Jung-moo, another famous South Korean footballer. (Some sources claimed Huh was Jung-moo's uncle.) Jung-moo started playing football after Huh urged him to become a youth football player.

Honours 
Korea Coal Corporation
Korean National Championship: 1964

South Korea B
AFC Asian Cup third place: 1964

Individual
KASA Best Korean Footballer: 1967

References

External links
 Huh Yoon-jung at KFA 
 
 

1936 births
Living people
South Korean footballers
Olympic footballers of South Korea
Footballers at the 1964 Summer Olympics
1964 AFC Asian Cup players
South Korean military personnel
Sportspeople from South Jeolla Province
Association football forwards